Anthropocosmic Nest is the second album by The Messthetics. Unlike their debut album which was recorded after having only been together for a short while, this album was recorded after a great deal of touring. Pirog estimates the band played about 200 gigs and therefore had a chance to perform the songs live for a while before recording them.

Track listing
Better Wings 		
Drop Foot 		
Section 9 		
Scrawler 		
The Assignment 		
Pay Dust 		
Pacifica 		
Because the Mountain Says So 		
Insect Conference 		
La Lontra 		
Touch Earth Touch Sky

Reception
Justin Cober-Lake of Spectrum Culture praised the album saying it "finds new ways to blend a hard rock rhythm with more outre approaches to jazz guitar" but felt that the album ran a little long. Vish Khanna of Exclaim! called the album "dynamic" and said it outdid their debut.

The album was featured in Bandcamp's "The Best Punk on Bandcamp" for September 2019.

Personnel
Joe Lally - Bass
Brendan Canty - Drums
Anthony Pirog - Guitar

References

External links
Anthropocosmic Nest at Dischord Records
Anthropocosmic Nest at Bandcamp

2019 albums
Dischord Records albums
The Messthetics albums